Molecular risk assessment is a procedure in which biomarkers (for example, biological molecules or changes in tumor cell DNA) are used to estimate a person's risk for developing cancer. Specific biomarkers may be linked to particular types of cancer.

Sources

External links 
 Molecular risk assessment entry in the public domain NCI Dictionary of Cancer Terms

Biological techniques and tools
Cancer screening